Her Majesty's Theatre is a theatre in London, since 1705. Her Majesty's Theatre may also refer to:

Her Majesty's Theatre, Adelaide, South Australia
Her Majesty's Theatre, Brisbane, Queensland, Australia, 1888–1983
Her Majesty's Theatre, Carlisle, Cumbria, England, 1905–1963
Her Majesty's Theatre, Melbourne, Victoria, Australia, since 1886
Her Majesty's Theatre, Montreal, Quebec, Canada, 1898–1963
Her Majesty's Theatre, Sydney, New South Wales, Australia, three different theatres

See also
His Majesty's Theatre (disambiguation)